Loews may refer to:

 Loews Cineplex Entertainment, formerly Loews Incorporated, a defunct North American cinema chain which formerly owned Metro-Goldwyn-Mayer
United States v. Loew's Inc., a United States Supreme Court case involving Loews 
 Loews Corporation, an American holding company
 Loews Hotels, a North American hotel chain

See also 
 Lowe's, an American home improvement store chain
 Lowes (disambiguation)
 Loew